COTE Korean Steakhouse is owned and operated by Simon Kim, a Korean-American restaurateur. The first location was opened in the Flatiron District of New York City in 2017 and has been awarded one Michelin star and several accolades from the James Beard Foundation. COTE is the only Michelin-starred Korean barbecue restaurant in the world. COTE's second location opened in Miami Design District in February, 2021.

COTE is a Korean word  (IPA: k͈o̞t̚ Korean: 꽃) that can mean flower, blossom, bloom, beauty, or essence.

History
COTE Korean Steakhouse in New York and Miami are owned and operated by Simon Kim, who was born in Seoul, South Korea and moved to Long Island, New York with his family when he was 13 years old. Kim's original “Korean Steakhouse” concept combines Korean barbecue with a high-end American steakhouse experience and was inspired by his dual nationalities.

Within one year of its opening, COTE New York earned its first Michelin star. The Michelin Guide noted its “particularly interesting wine list”.

COTE has received numerous accolades from the prestigious James Beard Foundation including Best New Restaurant, 2018; Outstanding Wine Program, 2019; and Outstanding Wine Program, 2020.

COTE Korean Steakhouse dry ages steaks in-house and is the only Korean steakhouse in New York with a dry aging room. Restaurant critic for the New York Times, Pete Wells, considered COTE to serve better beef than any other Korean BBQ restaurant in New York City. COTE Miami has its Vegetable Fermentation Lab.

COTE's head chef is David Shim, who previously worked at M. Wells and L'Atelier de Joël Robuchon. “Wine prodigy” Victoria James is the Beverage Director.

In October 2018, Kim opened Undercote, an underground bar and cocktail lounge underneath COTE New York.

Before opening COTE, Kim operated the now-closed Michelin-starred restaurant, Piora, in the West Village of New York City.

In 2022, the Miami location also won a Michelin star.

See also
List of Korean restaurants
List of Michelin starred restaurants in New York City

References

External links

Restaurants in Manhattan
Michelin Guide starred restaurants in New York (state)
Flatiron District
Korean restaurants in the United States